The Return of Vasili Bortnikov (Vozvrashshyeniye Vasiliya Bortnikova) is a 1953 Soviet drama film directed by Vsevolod Pudovkin based on the novel The Harvest by Galina Nikolayeva.

Cast
 Sergei Lukyanov - Vasili Bortnikov
 Natalya Medvedeva - Avdotya
 Nikolai Timofeyev - Stephan
 Anatoli Chemodurov - Chekanov
 Inna Makarova - Frosya
 Anatoli Ignatyev - Pavel
 Vsevolod Sanayev - Kentaurov
 Klara Luchko - Natalya
 Galina Stepanova		
 Nonna Mordyukova		
 Mariya Yarotskaya		
 Andrei Petrov		
 Danuta Stolyarskaya

External links

1953 films
Mosfilm films
Films directed by Vsevolod Pudovkin
Soviet drama films
1953 drama films